Actaeon was launched at Topsham, Devon in 1815. She traded widely and from 1823 she made some voyages to Bombay under a license from the British East India Company (EIC). She then traded with what is now Peru, and was probably condemned in what is now Chile in 1828.

Career
Acteon first appeared in Lloyd's Register (LR) in 1816.

In 1813 the EIC had lost its monopoly on the trade between India and Britain. British ships were then free to sail to India or the Indian Ocean under a license from the EIC.

On 6 December 1823 J.Briggs sailed Actaeon sailed for Bombay under a license from the EIC. She arrived at Bombay on 28 May 1824. She sailed from there on 24 June and arrived back at Deal on 17 November.

On 1 June 1825 Actaeon, Briggs, master, sailed from Gravesend for Lima. That same day she arrived at Deal, preparing to sail for Valparaiso. On 31 August she arrived at Rio de Janeiro. On 17 September she sailed for Valparaiso, and she arrived there on 18 November. On 20 April 1826 she arrived at Valparaiso again from Callao.

Fate
Actaeons fate is currently obscure. She was last listed in LR in 1829 with data stale since 1826. The Register of Shipping last listed her in 1832, also with data unchanged since 1826. However, Lloyd's List reported on 2 December 1828 that Actaeon, Gaymer, master, had been condemned at Telcahuano. Actaeon is an unusual name (there were only two in the registers at this time with the other Actaeon being a coaster), so it is most probable, but absent original research not certain, that this account is correct.

Citations and references
Citations

References
 

1815 ships
Ships built in England
Age of Sail merchant ships of England